Iker Muniain Goñi (born 19 December 1992) is a Spanish footballer who plays for Athletic Bilbao, where he is captain, mainly as a left winger.

Due to his style of play and stature, he was dubbed "the Spanish Messi" by the media. He has spent all of his professional career with Athletic Bilbao after debuting in 2009 as their youngest player in a competitive match. He helped the team reach the final of the UEFA Europa League in 2012 as well as four Copa del Rey finals in nine years, though finished on the losing side each time; in 2022 he became the sixth player to make 500 appearances for the club.

Muniain made 59 appearances for Spain at youth level, winning the European Under-21 Championship in 2011 and 2013. He also featured at the 2012 Olympics, in the same year as his senior Spain debut. He was selected again in 2019, gaining a second international cap seven years after the first.

Club career

Precocious debut
Born in Pamplona, Navarre, Muniain was a product of Basque giants Athletic Bilbao's youth ranks after joining at the age of 12. In January 2009, he made his debut for the reserve team Bilbao Athletic in the Segunda División B, aged 16 years and 16 days, and scored his first goal at that level 19 days later.

Muniain made his first-team debut on 30 July 2009, in a UEFA Europa League qualifying match against BSC Young Boys: he entered the field as a 59th-minute substitute for Gaizka Toquero in an eventual 1–0 home defeat, thus becoming the youngest player in 94 years to wear Athletic's shirt in an official game at 16 years, 7 months and 11 days old, only behind Domingo Acedo who scored on his debut in 1914. One week later, in the return leg in Switzerland, he netted his first goal, in a 2–1 win that qualified for the playoff rounds; he again entered the club's record books as the joint-second-youngest player to find the net (16 years, 7 months and 18 days) in a competitive match – behind Acedo and level with Agustín Gaínza– and the youngest ever in a European match.

Another record fell on 30 August 2009, as Muniain started in the 1–0 home victory over RCD Espanyol, 2009–10's opener, becoming the youngest player to have donned the club's shirt in La Liga (overtaking Patxi Ferreira). Two weeks later he scored again in European competition, 3–0 at home against FK Austria Wien, after a good team move involving Andoni Iraola and veteran Joseba Etxeberria.

On 4 October 2009, Muniain became the youngest player to score in a first division match as he achieved that feat in a 2–2 draw at Real Valladolid, aged 16 years and 289 days– that record was surpassed by Málaga CF's Fabrice Olinga in August 2012. On 1 December he signed his first professional contract, running until June 2015. On the 6th, after nearly one month out due to injury, he returned to action, scoring as a 51st-minute substitute to give his team the lead, albeit in a 2–1 loss to Valencia CF. He set up both goals in the next game, a 2–1 win at Real Zaragoza, and finished his first senior season with 35 appearances and six goals across all competitions.

2010s

Muniain was an undisputed starter in the 2010–11 campaign, featuring as a left winger for the Joaquín Caparrós-led side. On 17 April 2011, he scored a last-minute goal in a 2–1 away defeat of CA Osasuna in his hometown; he was initially booked for taking his hand to his ear during his celebrations (before signing for Athletic he played for UDC Txantrea in Pamplona, and always considered Osasuna a rival organisation. He did clarify that, just because he had affection for a particular organisation, it did not mean he held any animosity towards any others) which meant a suspension for his fifth yellow card of the season, but it was later lifted. Now allowed to take part in the following matchday, the derby against Real Sociedad, he netted another in a 2–1 home victory.

Muniain took part in 58 games overall in 2011–12, scoring on nine occasions as the Lions reached both the Europa League and the Copa del Rey finals. In early 2012, he was linked with a move away from Athletic, although a move never materialised as he did not push for a move with three years still left on his contract. He scored just once in 33 league appearances the following campaign, netting the only goal on 10 March 2013 in a home win over Valencia which eased doubts over a possible relegation battle.

On 1 December 2013, Muniain was again the sole name on the scoresheet at the new San Mamés Stadium, to hand FC Barcelona their first league loss of that season. Eighteen days later, he celebrated his 21st birthday by grabbing a brace in a 4–0 domestic cup home victory against RC Celta de Vigo, which signified his team progressed through to the round of 16 4–1 on aggregate. In that period, media reports suggested that his progression as a footballer in his 20s had slowed after showing such high potential as a young teenager.

Knee injuries
On 4 April 2015, during a game against Sevilla FC, Muniain suffered the first serious injury of his career, being sidelined for several months with an anterior cruciate ligament ailment to his left knee– this meant he was unable to take any part in the year's Spanish Cup or Supercopa de España finals. After suffering some setbacks in his recovery process he returned to action on 20 December, replacing Iñaki Williams for the last minutes of a 2–0 home defeat of Levante UD.

Muniain successfully regained his first-team place in December 2015 and made 86 further appearances between then and 28 September 2017, when he suffered another serious ACL injury (this time to his right knee) in the closing stages of a Europa League fixture at home to FC Zorya Luhansk, potentially ending his season. After an absence of just over six months, he returned to action as a substitute in a domestic league match against Villarreal CF on 9 April 2018, scoring his side's third in a 3–1 away win.

Muniain signed a new deal with Athletic Bilbao in November 2018 to run until summer 2024, as his link was set to expire; unusually, it did not include any buyout clause. He said: "I didn’t want a release clause because I do not want to have a price or be for sale. I want to go hand in hand with Athletic to the end... I want to be here for the rest of my career helping the club achieve nice things." Following the departures of Ander Iturraspe and Markel Susaeta in summer 2019 he was appointed as the club captain, and also reached the milestone of ten years with the first team.

2020s
On 19 January 2020, Muniain became the 18th player in Athletic's history to play 400 official games, against Celta. In July of that year, his 420th match set the club record for a player from Navarre, surpassing Ismael Urzaiz. On 8 November, he made his 430th appearance to enter its top 10 (equalling Julen Guerrero's total) at the age of 27.

In early 2021, with the team playing a more attacking style under new coach Marcelino García Toral, Muniain recorded eight assists in three competitions between 17 January and 15 February (bettering his total for some entire seasons previously), including two in the Spanish Supercup final as his team won the trophy. During April of that year he took the field in the 2020 (delayed due to the COVID-19 pandemic) and 2021 Spanish Cup finals, both played in an empty Estadio de la Cartuja – the same venue as the Supercup win – due to the pandemic restrictions. Athletic lost the first match 1–0 to Real Sociedad, with Muniain breaking a footballing superstition before kick-off by touching the trophy (considered to be 'bad luck') but praised for his sportsmanship for staying on the pitch after the final whistle to applaud the winners. A pre-match injury doubt for the second final two weeks later, he stated to the press "Cups and trophies are not won or lost because one touches it or not. They are won on the pitch, and that is the only reality", but this time it was noted he kept his hands well away from the prize; nevertheless his team were defeated 4–0 by Barcelona and he was withdrawn at half-time with the score at 0–0 and did not feature again that season, missing the last eight league fixtures. 

On 31 October 2021, Muniain scored a late equaliser in the Basque derby via a free kick and was again conspicuous for his sportsmanship in consoling the opposing goalkeeper Álex Remiro, a former Athletic player whose error had contributed to the goal. In February 2022, it was assessed that he had created 60 scoring chances in that league campaign and 72 in all competitions, the most by any player by both counts.

Muniain made his 500th appearance for Athletic on the first matchday of 2022–23 against RCD Mallorca, reaching the milestone at a younger age than the five other players to do so. He was honoured in a reception after that match, and was presented with a momento by two of those men – José Ángel Iribar and Susaeta – on the pitch before the next fixture against Valencia six days later.

International career

On 8 February 2011, at the age of only 18, Muniain made his debut with the Spain under-21 team in a match against Denmark, replacing Adrián López. Subsequently, he was selected by manager Luis Milla to the squad that appeared in the 2011 UEFA European Championship, appearing in all the games as the nation won its third title in the category and qualified to the 2012 Summer Olympics.

On 24 February 2012, Muniain was called up to the senior side for the first time, for a friendly with Venezuela. Five days later, he came on for Cesc Fàbregas in the 74th minute of the 5–0 win in Málaga. Later that year, at the Summer Olympic Games in London, he made two appearances as Spain exited in the group stage without scoring a goal.

Muniain earned 31 caps for the under-21s, which was a national record for three years before being surpassed by Gerard Deulofeu. In 2019, after showing fine form for his club, he was selected in the senior squad for two UEFA Euro 2020 qualifying matches; he played his second match more than seven years after the first, as well as his competitive debut, as a substitute in a 2–0 victory over Malta on 26 March.

Muniain also featured for the unofficial Basque Country regional team.

Personal life
Muniain has two older cousins who are also footballers, were both Athletic youth players and were briefly his teammates at Bilbao Athletic. Adrien Goñi, a midfielder, made a handful of first-team appearances before embarking on a career in the Spanish third division. Winger Julen Goñi eventually moved to Barakaldo CF also in that tier, but departed when they were relegated and did not find another club at that level.

Muniain's son was born in February 2015, with the player announcing his girlfriend's pregnancy in August 2014 by gesturing while celebrating his goal against S.S.C. Napoli in the play-off of the UEFA Champions League. He is an admirer of Sergio Agüero, and named his pet Labrador Kun after the Argentina international; Muniain's own nickname, Bart Simpson, was given to him by Fernando Amorebieta due to his mischievous personality as well as his diminutive stature and fair hair.

Having vowed to have the Europa League trophy tattooed on his body if Athletic Bilbao won the 2012 final, which did not happen, Muniain did have the Supercopa de España trophy 'inked' on his leg in 2015 following the team's victory (albeit he took no part in the matches due to injury). Another tattoo on the rear of his neck, XIX, (19 in Roman numerals) refers to his birth date and that of his brother, and was his original Athletic squad number for several seasons although he wore 27 as a promoted youth player in his breakthrough campaign, and in 2016 changed to the traditional playmaker's number 10.

Career statistics

Club

International

Honours
Athletic Bilbao
Supercopa de España: 2020–21
Copa del Rey runner-up: 2011–12, 2014–15, 2019–20, 2020–21
UEFA Europa League runner-up: 2011–12

Spain U21
UEFA European Under-21 Championship: 2011, 2013

Spain U19
UEFA European Under-19 Championship runner-up: 2010

Spain U17
FIFA U-17 World Cup third place: 2009

Individual
La Liga Breakthrough Player of the Year: 2010–11
European Golden Boy: shortlisted 2010, 2011, 2012
La Liga Team of the Season: 2021–22

Notes

References

External links

1992 births
Living people
Footballers from Pamplona
Spanish footballers
Association football wingers
Association football forwards
La Liga players
Segunda División B players
Bilbao Athletic footballers
Athletic Bilbao footballers
Spain youth international footballers
Spain under-21 international footballers
Spain under-23 international footballers
Spain international footballers
Olympic footballers of Spain
Footballers at the 2012 Summer Olympics
Basque Country international footballers